Like all municipalities of Puerto Rico, Aguadilla is subdivided into administrative units called barrios, which are roughly comparable to minor civil divisions. The barrios and subbarrios, in turn, are further subdivided into smaller local populated place areas/units called sectores (sectors in English). The types of sectores may vary, from normally sector to urbanización to reparto to barriada to residencial, among others. Some sectors appear in two barrios.

List of sectors by barrio

Aguacate
Reparto Los Robles
Reparto Roldán
Sector Calero
Sector Villa Min
Urbanización Nuevo San Antonio
Urbanización Quintas de San José
Urbanización Ramón Marín
Urbanización Villa Aurelia
Urbanización Villa del Paraíso
Urbanización Villa Jiménez
Urbanización Villa Montaña
Urbanización Villa Sotomayor
Urbanización Villas del Mar
Villa Olga

Aguadilla barrio-pueblo

Although Aguadilla officially consists of only one single barrio-pueblo, it is traditionally subdivided into two areas or subbarrios:

Barrio Pueblo (Norte)

Avenida Los Robles
Calle Barbosa
Calle Ceiba
Calle Duda
Calle Fuerte
Calle Reguero
Calle Stahl
Callejón del Fuerte
Cerro Juan Vega
Condominio Cuesta Vieja
El Chapey
El Perú
Joya Las Marinas
Residencial Cuesta Vieja
Residencial Puesta del Sol
Sector Cerro Los Condenados (Cuesta Vieja)
Sector Cerro Reguero
Sector Cuesta Nueva
Sector Cuesta Vieja
Sector La Vía (Norte)
Sector Llanos Jiménez
Sector Luquillo
Sector Tamarindo

Barrio Pueblo (Sur y Centro)

Avenida San Carlos
Barriada Visbal
Barrio Higuey
Barrio Iglesias
Calle Mercado
Calle Mercedes Moreno
Calle Progreso
Cerro Cabrera
Cerro Calero

Cerro Echevarría
Cerro Gonzalo
Condominio Torres del Sol
Condominio Villa Mar
Residencial Villamar
Salsipuedes
Santa Bárbara
Sector Campo Alegre
Sector Cerro Las Ánimas
Sector Gregorio Vélez Vaz
Sector Joyas San Carlos
Sector La Vía (Sur)

Arenales
Condominio San Carlos
Sector La Charca
Urbanización Solares

Borinquen

Apartamentos Sea View
Avenida Montemar
Comunidad Borinquen (Parcelas Nuevas)
Condominio Puerta del Mar
Extensión Villa Marbella
Jardines de Borinquen
Reparto El Faro
Reparto Ramos
Reparto Solá
Reparto Tres Palmas
Residencial Público Agustín Stahl
Sandford
Sector Crash Boat
Sector El Chapey
Sector El Cobo
Sector El Cuco
Sector El Faro
Sector El Macetazo
Sector El Saco
Sector Jobos
Sector Las Dos Curvas
Sector Nino Valentín
Sector Playa India

Sector Playuela
Sector Rovira
Urbanización Bella Flores
Urbanización Borinquen
Urbanización Costa del Mar
Urbanización Costa del Sol
Urbanización El Verde
Urbanización Flamboyán
Urbanización Laderas del Mar
Urbanización Las Américas
Urbanización Las Casitas
Urbanización Las Mansiones
Urbanización Marbella
Urbanización Monte Verde
Urbanización Parque Los Caobos
Urbanización Villa Blanca
Urbanización Villa Haydeé
Urbanización Villa Krystal
Urbanización Villa Matías
Urbanización Villa Ruth
Villa Águeda
Villa Betania
Villa de Palma Real
Villa Lydia
Villa Marta
Vista Alegre

Caimital Alto
Apartamentos Los Rosa
Apartamentos Paseo Miramar
Carretera los Rosa
Reparto Caimital
Reparto Grajales
Reparto Herreras
Reparto Natividad Romero
Reparto Villa Grajales
Sector Carretera La Palma
Sector Laureles
Sector Los López
Sector Pellot
Sector Pupo Jiménez
Sector Reichard
Sector Sotomayor
Sector Villa Santana
Sector Zambrana
Urbanización La Palma
Urbanización Mansiones de Versalles
Urbanización Paseo de Aguadilla
Urbanización Quintas de Monterey
Urbanización Villa Avelina
Urbanización Villa del Carmen
Urbanización Villas de Monserrate
Urbanización Villas del Rey

Caimital Bajo
Apartamentos Villa Mar
Avenida Jesús T. Piñero
Avenida Los Corazones
Avenida Victoria
Callejón Los Concepción
Condominio Manuel A. Colón
Condominio Muñekís II
Cuesta Vieja
Égida Jardín del Atlántico
Los Robles
Monte Brujo
Paseo Las Golondrinas
Reparto Grajales
Residencial José A. Aponte
Residencial José de Diego
Richard Moufler
Sector Cambija
Sector El Jobo
Sector Gregorio Igartua
Sector La Pica
Sector Lloret
Sector Sanders
Sector Toño Colón
Urbanización Aromas de Café
Urbanización García
Urbanización Jardines de Maribel
Urbanización Monte Real
Urbanización Victoria
Villa Alegría

Camaceyes
Barrio Camaceyes Este
Barrio Camaceyes Sur
Calle El Castillo
Calle González
Calle Los Morales
Calle Tony Croato
Carretera Feliciano
Condominio Chalet Deville
Condominio Portales de Camaceyes
Égida Víctor Hernández
Extensión El Prado
Hacienda Andares
Llanos Verdes
Los Morales
Los Vázquez
Paseo del Parque
Paseos de Jaicoa
Paseos Providencia
Reparto Jiménez
Reparto Llanos Verdes
Reparto López
Reparto San José
Residencial Montaña
Residencial Villa Nueva
Residencial y Urbanización García Ducós
Sector Barrio Las Palomas
Sector El Cuco
Sector Feliciano
Sector La Alambra
Sector La Esquina
Sector Santos Gómez
Sector Solá del Llano
Urbanización Alhambra
Urbanización El Prado
Urbanización Hacienda Los Andrés
Urbanización Jardines de Aguadilla
Urbanización Las Colinas
Urbanización Maleza Gardens
Urbanización Montaña
Urbanización Parque La Arboleda
Urbanización Paseo Alta Vista
Urbanización Paseo Lomas Llanas
Urbanización Paseo Universitario
Urbanización Portales de Camaceyes
Urbanización Rubianes
Urbanización San Carlos
Urbanización Tony Croatto
Urbanización Villas de Prado Alto
Urbanización Villas del Horizonte
Urbanización Villas Universitarias
Villa Juanita
Villa Universidad

Ceiba Alta
Calle Kennedy
Condominio Monte Real
Hacienda Loma Linda
Reparto González Ramos
Reparto Ramos Cerezo
Reparto Ramos Muñiz
Sector Venetian
Urbanización Paseo Los Cerezos
Urbanización Paseos Reales
Urbanización Vista al Horizonte
Villa Cortez

Ceiba Baja
Carretera Sanders
Paseos de Aguadilla
Reparto Apolo
Reparto González
Reparto Riollano
Reparto Santa María
Reparto Villa Grajales
Sector Angelito Cruz
Sector Herrera
Sector Los Posada
Sector Monte Cristo
Sector Paseo del Paraíso
Sector Villa Damasco
Urbanización Atlantic View
Urbanización Estancias Barreto
Urbanización Jardines de Versalles
Urbanización Quintas de Monterey
Urbanización Villa Esperanza
Urbanización Villas del Rey

Corrales
Apartamentos Galero
Cabán Viejo
Calle Alelí
Calle Húcar
Calle Yagrumo
Comunidad Cabán
Condominio Muñekís I
Reparto San Francisco
Reparto Santa Ana
Residencial Las Muñecas
Sector Angelito Cruz
Sector Carretera La Palma
Sector Villa Cardona
Sector Villa Estancia
Urbanización Cristal (Comunidad Corrales)
Urbanización Estancias del Atlántico
Urbanización Esteves
Urbanización Jardines de Versalles
Urbanización Monte Azul
Urbanización Monte Rey
Urbanización Monte Verde
Urbanización Paseos del Canal
Urbanización Santa María
Urbanización Santa Marta
Urbanización Villa del Rocío
Urbanización Villa Estela
Urbanización Villa Linda
Urbanización Vista Verde (Cabán Nuevo)

Guerrero
Comunidad Rafael Hernández
Reparto La Ceiba
Sector La Paloma
Sector Muñiz
Urbanización Jardines Guerrero

Maleza Alta
Urbanización Villa Liza

Maleza Baja
Base Ramey
Sector Las Villas
Sector Martinica
Sector Vista Ramey
Urbanización Base Ramey
Urbanización Las Villas Light House

Montaña
Poblado San Antonio
Reparto Chepo Fernández
Reparto Los Pinos
Reparto Roldán
Residencial Nuevo San Antonio
Sector Campo Alegre
Sector Las Palmas
Sector Pablo Hernández
Sector Parcelas Nuevas
Sector Villa Primavera
Urbanización Brisas de Campo Alegre
Urbanización Marín García
Urbanización Paseo Campo Alegre
Urbanización Paseo Continental
Urbanización Villa Sotomayor
Villa Jardines

Palmar
Camino Bosque
Camino Cordero
Camino Ismael Torres
Camino Rivera
Comunidad Palmar
Reparto Sara
Sector Arocho
Sector Corea
Sector Fuentes
Sector Los Torres
Sector Polo Medina
Sector Viñet
Urbanización Cortez

Victoria
Condominio Vistamar

See also

 List of communities in Puerto Rico

References

Aguadilla
Aguadilla